Ján Koristek is a Slovakian cross-country skier who competes internationally.

He represented his country at the 2022 Winter Olympics.

References

External links

Slovak male cross-country skiers
1996 births
Living people
Olympic cross-country skiers of Slovakia
Cross-country skiers at the 2022 Winter Olympics
Sportspeople from Zvolen